MAB Kargo (Malaysia Airlines Berhad Cargo), operating as MASkargo and stylised as maskargo, is a cargo airline with its head office in the Advanced Cargo Centre (ACC) on the grounds of Kuala Lumpur International Airport (WMKK/KUL) in Sepang, Selangor, Malaysia. It is a cargo division of its parent company Malaysia Airlines (MAS) that operates scheduled, charter air cargo services as well as airport to seaport cargo logistics via ground transportation.

History

The company was established in 1972 to handle the delivery of cargo around the world via Malaysia Airlines' global network of routes. Back then, MASkargo handled 30,000 tonnes of cargo. It became a subsidiary of Malaysia Airlines in April 1997 with two Boeing 747-200F freighters from the parent company. It has 1,092 employees (as of March 2007). Now, at the new cargo facility located in the Advanced Cargo Centre (ACC) KLIA, MASkargo has the capacity to serve customers' cargo needs up to a million tonnes.

In 2010, MASkargo simplified its image moving away from the parent company's colourful scheme, the livery features plain white aircraft with the tail logo and titles, this style had been in use since the 1990s but only on aircraft leased from other carriers.

On 30 April 2015, Malaysia Airlines announced it would either lease out or sell MASkargo's entire fleet due to its ongoing financial crisis. On 1 November 2015, Malaysia Airlines CEO told reporters MASkargo would not be shut down.

In March 2016 the renamed MAB Kargo signed an agreement with Silk Way Airlines of Azerbaijan which sees it use block space on Slik Way flights from Kuala Lumpur to Amsterdam via Baku, thus ending its own freighter aircraft service to Europe via the Middle East countries where it had served Dubai-Al Maktoum Airport.

In October 2016 both Boeing 747-400 planes were phased out and a third Airbus A330-200F which was stored for 6 months, was added to the fleet.

Destinations

MASkargo provides freighter services to the following (as of November 2019):

Amsterdam is also served in block space agreement by Silk Way West Airlines and Jakarta through same by Raya Airways

Fleet

As of August 2017, the MASkargo fleet consists of the following aircraft:

MASkargo products and services

I-PORT
With MASkargo's recent “an airport within a seaport” plan, the company has extended its services to Port Klang, a major seaport in Peninsular Malaysia. A designated air-zone has been established in Port Klang to facilitate this. A collaboration with MASkargo and Port Klang Terminal Operators, the I-port aims to promote Port Klang/KLIA as the load centre for sea and air traffic in the region. Kuala Lumpur's location on the main flight routes of Asia is a fact worth mentioning as are the low operation costs.

The I-port sees a hassle-free transfer of cargo from the seaport in Port Klang to MASkargo's Advanced Cargo Centre. This service ensures an efficient customs declaration any additional documentation as all sea- to- air shipment from the seaports are sealed by the Customs Department, and loaded on to MASkargo's scheduled trucks for outbound destinations through KLIA. Cargo space and flights for the intended airport of destinations are pre-booked by forwarding agents at the MASkargo Air-Zone online handling office, known as "XPQ", situated within the port's Northport Container Yard Terminal. With the introduction of AFTA beginning January 2003, the movement of cargo within the region is expected to increase substantially. I-PORT is listed in the Malaysian Guinness Book of Records as the first service of its kind in Malaysia.

i-secure
i-secure is a new airport-to-airport logistics facility from MASkargo. Designed for all vulnerable cargo requiring high security service every step of the way, from point of acceptance to point of delivery. Cargo under this service will be stored in a permanent-surveillance area prior to being transported. Types of cargo supported by i-secure include semi-conductor products, consumer electronics, cameras, CD-ROM, computers, watches, and pharmaceutical items. The new i-secure service from MASkargo caters specifically for priority and secure cargo shipments. i-secure is currently available at Malaysia Airlines stations worldwide.

i-secure benefits include:
 Security arrangements at airport of origin, transit and destination.
 Service standard for guaranteed smooth cargo clearance
 Priority uplift gets your cargo released and shipped faster
 Utmost care during cargo inspection and handling
 Cargo storage in a permanent-surveillance areas.

Animal Hotel (AVI)
Opened in the year 1998, the same year KLIA (Kuala Lumpur International Airport) began operations, the MASkargo Animal Hotel started as a centre catering to inbound animal shipments for staging and delivery. This changed on 15 June 2004 when the Animal Hotel became a one-stop-centre. The activities included import, export and trans-shipment delivery and payment. Only then did it transform into a 6-star facility. The MASkargo Animal Hotel is reputed to be one of the best in the world.

The MASkargo Animal Hotel has over 1,297 sq m of space. The animals and pets are given ample space to roam before their flight of upon arrival. The MASkargo Animal Hotel is the sole Animal Hotel in Asia, and one of three in the world. The facility caters to animals such as horses, tigers, fishes, birds, reptiles and elephants. The animals are under the care of the MASkargo team of experienced handlers, and are provided with constant supervision, from acceptance to delivery during the transit.

The facility is open 24 hours daily. An on-call veterinarian is available. The MASkargo Animal Hotel places emphasis on comfort, safety and hygiene.

Priority Business Centre
MASkargo's Priority Business Centre is designed to serve by-invitation only customers. Initiated by MASkargo as a first of its kind in the air cargo industry, PBC is open 24 hours a day. The facility is located at Core 2 Ground Floor of MASkargo's Advanced Cargo Centre in KLIA and is staffed by a team of supervisors and officers.

Perishable centre
A perishable centre was set up by MASkargo to ensure that perishable cargo remains well preserved; the one-stop centre takes care of the acceptance and delivery of the perishable cargo under one roof. MASkargo provides an “unbroken cool chain" for optimum cooling conditions. Cargo is moved as soon as possible to cold rooms where up to 16 units of ULD may be stored. By doing so, the freshness of the cargo is ensured.

References

Notes
 Malaysia Airlines; (2002). Malaysia Airlines Cabin Crew Manual: Introduction to Malaysia Airlines. Kuala Lumpur: Flight Operations.
 Berita Pulse; (October 2006). Berita Pulse, October 2006. Kuala Lumpur: Communications Division, Malaysia Airlines.
 Berita Pulse; (August 2006). Berita Pulse, August 2006. Kuala Lumpur: Communications Division, Malaysia Airlines.
 Berita Pulse; (July 2006). Berita Pulse, July 2006. Kuala Lumpur: Communications Division, Malaysia Airlines.
 Berita Pulse; (June 2006). Berita Pulse, June 2006. Kuala Lumpur: Communications Division, Malaysia Airlines.
 "MASkargo: Corporate Info". Retrieved 31 October 2006.
 Going Places; (August 2006). Going Places, August 2006. Kuala Lumpur: Communications Division, Malaysia Airlines.
 "AeroMalaysia: Malaysia Airlines: Current fleet". Retrieved 31 October 2006.
 "AeroMalaysia: Malaysia Airlines: Former Fleet". Retrieved 31 October 2006.

External links 

 Penerbangan Malaysia Berhad - Parent Company
 Malaysia Airlines - Corporate Website
 MASkargo - MASkargo Corporate Website
 Port of Tanjung Pelepas PTP Corporate Website
 Northport - Northport Corporate Website
 Westport - Westport Corporate Website

1972 establishments in Malaysia
Cargo airlines of Malaysia
Airlines of Malaysia
Malaysia Airlines
Airlines established in 1972
Companies based in Sepang
Malaysian companies established in 1972